The Consensus 1987 College Basketball All-American team, as determined by aggregating the results of four major All-American teams.  To earn "consensus" status, a player must win honors from a majority of the following teams: the Associated Press, the USBWA, The United Press International and the National Association of Basketball Coaches.

1987 Consensus All-America team

Individual All-America teams

AP Honorable Mention:

Tommy Amaker, Duke
Freddie Banks, UNLV
Nate Blackwell, Temple
Sherman Douglas, Syracuse
Ledell Eackles, New Orleans
Tellis Frank, Western Kentucky
Gary Grant, Michigan
Jeff Grayer, Iowa State
Hersey Hawkins, Bradley
Kevin Houston, Army
Derrick Lewis, Maryland
Troy Lewis, Purdue
Reggie Miller, UCLA
José Ortiz, Oregon State
J. R. Reid, North Carolina
David Rivers, Notre Dame
Charles Smith, Pittsburgh
Rod Strickland, DePaul
Chris Welp, Washington
Joe Wolf, North Carolina

References

NCAA Men's Basketball All-Americans
All-Americans